Uganik is a community in the Kodiak Island Borough of the U.S. state of Alaska. Other variations of the name that have been reported are Oohanick in 1805, Ooganok in the 1880 Census (population 73), and Uganak in the 1890 Census (population 31).

Uganik is located on the north coast of Kodiak Island, at the west shore of the northeast arm of Uganik Bay.

The community is served by the San Juan (Uganik) Seaplane Base, which has scheduled passenger service subsidized by the U.S. Essential Air Service program.

References

Unincorporated communities in Alaska